Pierre H. Léger (July 15, 1858 – 1900) was a farmer, trader and political figure in New Brunswick, Canada. He represented Kent County in the Legislative Assembly of New Brunswick from 1896 to 1900 as a Conservative member.

He was born in Grande-Digue, New Brunswick and studied at the College of St. Joseph in Memramcook. Léger was a justice of the peace and served on the municipal council. He died in office in 1900.

References 
The Canadian parliamentary companion, 1897, JA Gemmill

1858 births
1900 deaths
St. Joseph's College alumni
People from Kent County, New Brunswick
Progressive Conservative Party of New Brunswick MLAs